Lufia & the Fortress of Doom, known as  in Japan, is a role-playing video game developed by Neverland and published by Taito in 1993, for the Super Nintendo Entertainment System. It is the first title in the Lufia series of video games and the only game from the series released  under the Taito label in North America.

The main characters of the game are The Hero, Lufia, Aguro, and Jerin.

Gameplay
Lufia & the Fortress of Doom plays much like a traditional role-playing video game and features 2D character sprites and environments. The player advances the story by travelling through several harsh dungeons, encountering monsters along the way. These battles occur randomly (every few steps or so) or in scripted situations, and winning them yields experience points that go towards leveling up the characters, giving them access to new abilities and making them stronger in the process. The battles themselves take place from a first-person perspective, and require the player to use each character's strengths, such as physical attacks or magic use, as in many other mainstream RPGs.

An interesting quirk in the battle system, reminiscent of older RPGs like the early Dragon Quest games, makes it such that when ordering two characters to attack a particular enemy, and the first character defeats the enemy, the second character's attack will still target the defeated enemy and thus miss. Thus foresight is required to make sure that no characters' battle moves are wasted, unlike other RPGs, where other enemies will be targeted if the intended enemy has already been defeated.

New equipment and restorative items are purchased from vendors in various towns, or found in chests scattered throughout the world. The player's progress is saved in one of three available slots on the cartridge's built-in battery back-up system by speaking to a priest at a church found in most towns.

Plot

Setting

The story of Lufia & the Fortress of Doom begins, in accordance with an ancient prophecy of the Lufia world, with a massive floating island with a large castle located on it emerging into the sky one dark day. Dubbed the "Fortress of Doom", this castle served as the base of operations for a group of all-powerful beings known as the Sinistrals, who planned to use their strength to bring the world to its knees.

In response, the people sent four of their bravest warriors: Maxim, Selan ("Serena" in Estopolis Denki), Artea ("Arty" in Estopolis Denki), and Guy, to infiltrate the dark fortress and destroy the Sinistrals before they could do any harm. The game begins with the player controlling these characters as they prepare to engage the Sinistrals, and eventually defeat them. However, after the battle, the fortress begins to collapse, with Maxim and Selan becoming trapped on the other side of a deep chasm that forms when the Sinistral throne room splits apart. Unable to teleport them to safety, Artea and Guy leave the falling island alone, and their trapped allies apparently perish when it crashes into the earth below.

Peace reigns for ninety years after the heroes' encounter with the Sinistrals, and the actual game is set nine years after that. The story is told from the perspective of a red-haired boy the player is in charge of naming, and along the way he gets caught up in a struggle to save the world once again from the newly emerged Sinistral army.

Story

Characters

Playable characters 
"The Hero": The primary character of the story that the player gets to name. He grew up in a small town of Alekia and was raised by a man named Roman, a friend of his father (who had died in a battle long ago). Very skilled in swordplay, The Hero prefers to fight in close quarters, and wears heavy armor, though he does have some degree of magical skill, usually healing and defense spells. He is said to be a descendant of the great hero Maxim who vanquished the Sinistrals and saved the world.
Lufia: The Hero's best friend whom he has known since childhood. She is bossy, but proficient in spellcasting.  She has a romantic interest in The Hero and helps him in any way she can. She fights with wands and other lightweight weapons such as flails and even frying pans. Lufia utilizes Thunder, Water and Explosion magic as well as numerous support spells.
Aguro: Leader of the army of the nation of Lorbenia, Aguro is a hardened warrior who is interested in the Hero's fighting ability. Having no skill in magic, he instead relies on his brute strength and skill with swords, axes and lances. He, like the Hero, can equip heavy armor to increase his defense.
Jerin: A half-elf who, because of her heritage, has an increased lifespan and actually appears younger than she is. Agile, and good with magic, Jerin prefers to fight at a distance, using either a bow and arrow or wands in combat. She is proficient with Fire and Ice magic and is a master of healing.

Starting characters
At the start of the game (introduction):
Maxim: The primary character in the prequel to Lufia and the Fortress of Doom. His past is much like "The Hero"'s present with certain variations.
Selan: Maxim's wife, Selan is a very powerful magic user but is not as strong with melee attacks.
Guy: Guy is a longtime friend of Maxim who has no knowledge of magic himself but is physically the most powerful character. 
Artea: An elf who can attack all targets with his bow and has a decent amount of magic. Artea lives through both comings of the Sinistrals due to the long lifespan of an elf.

Non-playable characters
 The Sinistrals: A group of four powerful, god-like warriors who plan on taking over the world. From their floating Fortress of Doom, they gathered their strength, only to be defeated by Maxim and his friends years ago. Their ranks include Gades, Master of Destruction, an over-bearing and proud warrior clad in dark armor; Amon, Master of Chaos, a resourceful man who wears gold armor and wields a trident; Erim, Mistress of Death, who can revive any of her brothers if they fall in combat; and Daos, Master of Terror, their leader, an incredibly powerful sorcerer. However, due to a mistake, in the English version Daos and Amon have their titles reversed. Daos is the Master of Chaos (Infernos in the Dutch Version), while Amon is the Master of Terror; this is the only game in the series where this localization error occurs.

Development
Taito began to develop a port of Lufia & the Fortress of Doom for the Sega Mega Drive/Genesis, but the game, primarily intended for a North American release, was not released because of Taito America's closure in 1995. At least two full-page advertisements were made in U.S. magazines, the second one announcing a delay to spring 1995, with the tagline "It's worth the wait". A ROM image of the Mega Drive version was leaked online in 2014 by a former programmer of the port.

Reception

In the United States, it was the top-selling Super NES game in February 1994.

Upon release, Electronic Games scored it 93%, calling it "the best RPG so far this year". In Dragon, Sandy Petersen gave the game 3 out of 5 stars. GamePro gave it ratings of 4.5/5 for graphics, 4/5 for sound, 4/5 for control and 4.5/5 for overall fun factor. Lufia  was runner-up for GamePro 1993 Role-Playing Game of the Year award, which was won by Secret of Mana.

Retrospectively, the game has received positive to mixed reviews. Some reflect on it fondly for its story and characters, while others criticize it as being inferior to other console RPGs of that era, such as Secret of Mana, the Final Fantasy titles, or its prequel Lufia II: Rise of the Sinistrals.

References

Sources
"Lufia & the Fortress of Doom Turns Ten". Forfeit Island. 2003. Last accessed May 9, 2005.

External links

Lufia.net

1993 video games
Cancelled Sega Genesis games
Lufia
Japanese role-playing video games
Neverland (company) games
Super Nintendo Entertainment System games
Super Nintendo Entertainment System-only games
Taito games
Video games developed in Japan
Single-player video games